The 1964–65 AHL season was the 29th season of the American Hockey League. The league inaugurates the James H. Ellery Memorial Award for outstanding media coverage of the AHL.

Nine teams played 72 games each in the schedule. The Rochester Americans finished first overall in the regular season, and won their first Calder Cup championship.

Final standings
Note: GP = Games played; W = Wins; L = Losses; T = Ties; GF = Goals for; GA = Goals against; Pts = Points;

Scoring leaders

Note: GP = Games played; G = Goals; A = Assists; Pts = Points; PIM = Penalty minutes

 complete list

Calder Cup playoffs
First round
Rochester Americans defeated Quebec Aces 4 games to 1.
Hershey Bears defeated Baltimore Clippers 3 games to 2.
Buffalo Bisons defeated Pittsburgh Hornets 3 games to 1.
Second round
Rochester Americans earned second round bye.
Hershey Bears defeated Buffalo Bisons 3 games to 2.  
Finals
Rochester Americans defeated Hershey Bears 4 games to 1, to win the Calder Cup. 
 list of scores

Trophy and award winners
Team awards

Individual awards

Other awards

See also
List of AHL seasons

References
AHL official site
AHL Hall of Fame
HockeyDB

American Hockey League seasons
2
2